The 1977–78 Weber State Wildcats men's basketball team represented Weber State College during the 1977–78 NCAA Division I basketball season. Members of the Big Sky Conference, the Wildcats were led by third-year head coach Neil McCarthy and played their home games on campus at the new Dee Events Center in Ogden, Utah.

Weber State was third in the regular season standings and qualified for the four-team conference tournament, hosted by regular season champion Montana in Missoula. The Wildcats defeated defending champion Idaho State in the  then upset the host in the final 

Weber State appeared in the first five finals of the conference tournament; this was the first of three consecutive titles.

The Wildcats received the Big Sky's automatic bid to the 32-team NCAA tournament, but lost in the first round to seventh-ranked Arkansas in Eugene, Oregon; Arkansas ultimately advanced to the Final Four.  It was Weber State's first NCAA appearance in five years, since they went to six consecutive (1968–1973).

Sophomore guard Bruce Collins was named to the all-conference team; forward David Johnson and center Richard Smith, also sophomores, were honorable mention.

Postseason results

|-
!colspan=6 style=| Big Sky tournament

|-
!colspan=6 style=| NCAA tournament

References

External links
Sports Reference – Weber State Wildcats: 1977–78 basketball season

Weber State Wildcats men's basketball seasons
Weber State
Weber State